Kabani is an Indian Malayalam television series directed by Sudheesh Sankar. The show premiered from 11 March 2019 on the channel Zee Keralam. It stars Gopika Anil, Prem Jacob and Keerthana Anil in lead roles along with Mallika Sukumaran and Krishna.

The series is a remake of the Telugu language television show Mutyala Muggu which was broadcast on Zee Telugu. The show was taken off the air abruptly, due to the COVID-19 pandemic in India from March 2020. Later, it was announced that it will not be brought back after the lockdown bringing the show to an abrupt ending.

Plot
The serial revolves around a girl named Kabani. Her passion is to pursue higher education, but due to her family situation, she is unable to continue her studies. Still, luckily she takes part in a kabaddi competition and grabs the opportunity of a scholarship in a renowned college in the city. Initially, she faces hardships in the college as she comes from the village, it becomes difficult for her to adapt to modern culture.

The story heats up when she meets her half-sister Rambha, who despises her. She also happens to meet Rishi, and they both start to have feelings for each other. Rambha is envious to see them together as she has a crush on Rishi. Rambha plots numerous plans to create a rift in their relationship. The remaining episodes showcase how they succeed in love even after tackling countless conspiracies created by Rambha.

Cast

Main
Gopika Anil as Kabani
Krishna as Surya
Keerthana Anil as Padmini
Prem Jacob as Professor Rishi
Anshitha as Rambha
Rajkumar Sathyanarayan as Rahul

Recurring
Mallika Sukumaran as Kottaramuttam Parvathyamma 
Swapna Treasa as Radhika/ Gouri 
Anjitha as Menaka
Niveditha S Menon as Devaranjini 
Ranjith Raj as Varun
Alice Christy as Nithya
Dhanya Chandralekha as Sanjana
Anoop MB Nair / Anu Gopi as Manikandan
Murali as Shekhar
Yamuna Mahesh as Urvashi 
T. P. Madhavan as Kabani's grandfather

Adaptations

References

External links
 Kabani at ZEE5

Malayalam-language television shows
Zee Keralam original programming